Dismegistus is a genus of true bugs belonging to the family Parastrachiidae.

Species 
Species in the genus include:
 Dismegistus binotatus (Westw.)
 Dismegistus circumcinctus (Hahn)
 Dismegistus costalis Reiche & Fairmaire in Ferret & Galinier 1850
 Dismegistus fimbriatus Thunb.
 Dismegistus funebris
 Dismegistus rufomarginatus Hesse 1925

References 

 Lis, J.A.; Schaefer, C.W. 2005: Tibial combs in the Cydnidae (Hemiptera: Heteroptera) and their functional, taxonomic and phylogenetic significance. Journal of zoological systematics and evolutionary research, 43(4): 277–283. doi: 10.1111/j.1439-0469.2005.00328.x

Pentatomomorpha genera